Catrina Elizabeth Gulliver  (born 30 November 1969) is an English professional darts player. She is the 10-time Women's World Professional Darts Champion of the British Darts Organisation (BDO). Her nickname is Golden Girl and in 2003, she was named as the BBC Midlands Sports Personality of the Year.

Early life

The daughter of publicans, Gulliver was born in Warneford Hospital in Leamington Spa, and was brought up in the small town of Southam in Warwickshire.

She trained as a carpenter and joiner, and later taught carpentry and joinery at Mid-Warwickshire College, Leamington Spa.

Darts career
From the introduction of the BDO Women's World Championship in 2001, Gulliver remained undefeated in the competition until her defeat in the 2008 Championship by Anastasia Dobromyslova. During this undefeated run Gulliver beat Francis Hoenselaar of the Netherlands to win the title on five occasions.  Gulliver has the top 3 highest winning 3 dart averages in the Women's World Championship, all of which are higher than 90. During the 2008 tournament Trina stated on many occasions that she was not happy with the prize money and the game length compared to the men's competition. In 2008 the women's champion only received £6,000, whereas the men's champion wins £95,000 and the male competition is first to 7 sets whereas the women's is first to 2. Despite this she didn't enter the inaugural (and thus so far only) PDC Women's World Championship in 2010, that offered higher prize money than the BDO version.

Gulliver was beaten in the 2009 World Championship Final by close friend Hoenselaar.  In 2010 Gulliver defeated Hoenselaar, Deta Hedman and Rhian Edwards all 2-0 to become World Champion for the first time since 2007.  In 2011 Gulliver defeated Wendy Weinstadtler, Irene Armstrong and Rhian Edwards all 2-0 to successfully defend the Women's World Championship.

Gulliver won the women's British Penathlon eight times. She also played in the men's event on several occasions, with a best finish of 12th (out of 20 entrants) in the 2001 edition. 

Gulliver has been sponsored by the leading Global Darts Brand Winmau for over 10 Years, and in 2003 was named as the BBC Midlands Sports Personality of the Year.

She was appointed Member of the Order of the British Empire (MBE) in the 2013 Birthday Honours for services to darts and to charitable fundraising.

Personal life
Gulliver married Paul Gulliver in 1994, after nine years together, and they lived in Southam, but divorced in 2005 after eleven years of marriage.

After the break up of her marriage, Gulliver became a secret alcoholic and used to drink four bottles of wine a night. She has spoken about her alcoholism and stated that, "I was lucky to survive". 

Gulliver came out after her divorce, although she kept it a secret from her family because she felt that she was going to "lose my sponsors, friends and whether my family would understand". She then lived in Cheddar, Somerset until 2017 with her England ladies' darts colleague Sue Gulliver. They signed a registered partnership in July 2010. As of 19 September 2022, her website stated she is "Married to Nicole van Gils".

Gulliver's mother Muriel died on 5 January 2012, two days before the start of the BDO World Darts Championship.  Trina still took part in the competition, at the request of her mother before she died.

Autobiography
2008 saw the publication of her autobiography, Golden Girl: The Autobiography of the Greatest Ever Ladies' Darts Player, which chronicles her ongoing rivalry with ladies' darts superstar and former Olympian Crissy Manley, wife of PDC player Peter Manley.

World Championship results

BDO
 2001: Winner (beat Mandy Solomons 2–1)
 2002: Winner (beat Francis Hoenselaar 2–1)
 2003: Winner (beat Anne Kirk 2–0)
 2004: Winner (beat Francis Hoenselaar 2–0)
 2005: Winner (beat Francis Hoenselaar 2–0)
 2006: Winner (beat Francis Hoenselaar 2–0)
 2007: Winner (beat Francis Hoenselaar 2–1)
 2008: Runner-up (lost to Anastasia Dobromyslova 0-2)
 2009: Runner-up (lost to Francis Hoenselaar 1–2)
 2010: Winner (beat Rhian Edwards 2–0)
 2011: Winner (beat Rhian Edwards 2–0)
 2012: Semi-finals (lost to Anastasia Dobromyslova 0–2)
 2013: Semi-finals (lost to Anastasia Dobromyslova 1–2)
 2014: First round (lost to Tamara Schuur 0–2)
 2015: Quarter-finals (lost to Lisa Ashton 0-2)
 2016: Winner (beat Deta Hedman 3-2)
 2017: Quarter-finals (lost to Aileen de Graaf 0-2)
 2018: Semi-finals (lost to Anastasia Dobromyslova 0-2)
 2019: Quarter-finals (lost to Lorraine Winstanley 0-2)

WSDT
 2022: Second round (lost to Robert Thornton 0–3)

References

Books

External links 
 Official Website
 Profile and stats on Darts Database

1969 births
Living people
English carpenters
English darts players
Members of the Order of the British Empire
Sportspeople from Leamington Spa
English LGBT sportspeople
Women carpenters
BDO women's world darts champions
Bisexual sportspeople
LGBT darts players